The Atlanta Child Murders is an American television miniseries that aired on February 10 and 12, 1985 on CBS.  The miniseries is a dramatization of the "Atlanta child murders" in which 29 African American children were murdered in Atlanta from summer 1979 through spring 1981. City officials, who had opted not to participate in the production, expressed disappointment at it.

Cast
 Calvin Levels as Wayne Williams
 Morgan Freeman as Ben Shelter
 James Earl Jones as Major Walker
 Rip Torn as Lewis Slaton
 Jason Robards as Alvin Binder
 Lynne Moody as Selena Cobb
 Ruby Dee as Faye Williams
 Gloria Foster as Camille Bell
 Paul Benjamin as Homer Williams
 Martin Sheen as Chet Dettlinger
 Andrew Robinson as Jack Mallard
 Bill Paxton as Campbell

Plot summary
Between the summer of 1979 and the spring of 1981, 29 African American children, adolescents and adults were murdered in Atlanta, Georgia. The killings gained nationwide attention, with many suspecting that they were the work of the Ku Klux Klan or a similar white supremacist group. However, in June 1981, a 23-year-old African American named Wayne Williams was arrested for first-degree murder in the deaths of 27-year-old Nathaniel Carter and 29-year-old Jimmy Ray Payne.  Eight months later, Williams was convicted of both killings and sentenced to two consecutive terms of life imprisonment. Some parties speculate that Williams was not the real killer, and that local law enforcement officials used him as a scapegoat to bring a seemingly unsolvable case to a close. However, it is generally presumed that Williams was the culprit in most of the murders, if not all of them. No one was ever tried in connection with the other killings.

Reception
Atlanta officials criticized The Atlanta Child Murders, claiming that it distorted the facts of the case. After a series of negotiations, CBS executives agreed to insert a disclaimer alerting viewers that the film is “not a documentary, but a drama based on certain facts surrounding the murder and disappearance of children in Atlanta”  and includes fictionalized events and characters.

In a February 10, 1985 review of The Atlanta Child Murders, the New York Times questioned whether the program should have been made at all at all, calling it "an irresponsible piece of work."

In 2000, Showtime aired a similarly-themed movie entitled Echo of Murder, starring James Belushi and Gregory Hines. When released on DVD, it was retitled Who Killed Atlanta's Children?

References

External links 
 

1985 films
1980s American television miniseries
Films about race and ethnicity
American crime drama films
CBS network films
Films directed by John Erman
American television docudramas
Crime films based on actual events
Television series based on actual events
Television shows set in Atlanta
Films set in 1979
Films set in 1980
Films set in 1981
Films set in 1982
1980s American films